The second series of The Green Green Grass originally aired between 15 September 2006 and 27 October 2006, beginning with the episode "Testing Times". A Christmas special aired on 25 December 2006.

Outline
The series continued to feature the seven main characters that appeared in series one. These were: 

Lisa Diveney's character, Beth, who was Tyler's girlfriend, was regular throughout the series, as was Llewellyn (Alan David) and Ray (Nigel Harrison).

Episodes

Production
The series was produced by Shazam Production, a company that produces comedies by John Sullivan. The series was filmed at Teddington Studios, with a live audience. All episodes in the first series were directed by Dewi Humphreys. This particular series was written by Jim Sullivan, John Sullivan, Derren Litten, James Windett and Paul Alexander.

Reception

Viewers
The series began airing on Friday evenings, at 8:30pm. The series continued to be hit with viewers, with the first episode, "Testing Times" gaining 5.04 million viewers, which was in the top thirty highest ratings for the week ending 17 September 2006. Ratings then fell for the next two episodes before rising for the fourth dropping again for the next two and ending on a series high. The ratings were high enough for a new series, of seven episodes, to be commissioned. A 2006 Christmas special was also commissioned to air later that year.

Critics
The comedy continued to be criticised due to its spin-off roots. As a spin-off of the nation's favourite sitcom, The Green Green Grass was always going to have a difficult start. The series continued receive negative reviews from critics and some fans of Only Fools and Horses as well.

References
Specific

General
The Green Green Grass at BBC Comedy
The Green Green Grass Official website
The Green Green Grass at British TV Comedy
British Sitcom Guide for The Green Green Grass
The Green Green Grass at Only Fools and Horses website
 

2006 British television seasons
The Green Green Grass